The Corsicana Daily Sun is a morning daily newspaper published in Corsicana, Texas, covering Navarro County. It is now published five days a week (Tuesday through Saturday).  It is owned by Community Newspaper Holdings Inc.

The newspaper's marketing slogan is "Your Community, Your Newspaper, Our Commitment."

References

External links
 Daily Sun Website
 CNHI Website

Corsicana Daily Sun
Corsicana Daily Sun